Stimulantia is a 1967 Swedish anthology film directed by Hans Abramson, Hans Alfredson, Arne Arnbom, Tage Danielsson, Lars Görling, Ingmar Bergman, Jörn Donner, Gustaf Molander, and Vilgot Sjöman.

Cast
 Hans Abramson as Interviewer and narrator
 Hans Alfredson as Jacob Landelius
 Harriet Andersson as Woman in hotel room
 Daniel Bergman as himself
 Ingrid Bergman as Matilda Hartman
 Gunnar Björnstrand as Paul Hartman
 Gunnel Broström as Jeanette Ribbing
 Lars Ekborg as Mr. Svensk
 Glenna Forster-Jones as Naked girl
 Lena Granhagen as Sofi Lundblad
 Inga Landgré as Margareta Svensk
 Käbi Laretei as herself
 Birgit Nilsson as herself

References

External links
 
 

1967 films
Anthology films
Films based on works by Guy de Maupassant
Films based on works by Honoré de Balzac
Films directed by Gustaf Molander
Films directed by Hasse Alfredson
Films directed by Ingmar Bergman
Films directed by Jörn Donner
Films directed by Tage Danielsson
Films directed by Vilgot Sjöman
Swedish drama films
1960s Swedish-language films
1960s Swedish films